The following is a list of episodes for the Canadian comedy series, Corner Gas. The program premiered on January 22, 2004 and aired its final episode on April 13, 2009. During its run, 107 episodes of Corner Gas aired.

Series overview
{| class="wikitable" style="text-align: center;"
|-
! style="padding: 0 8px;" colspan="2" rowspan="2"| Season
! style="padding: 0 8px;" rowspan="2"| Episodes
! colspan="2"| Originally aired
|-
! First aired
! Last aired
|-
 |bgcolor="32CD32" |
 |1
 |13
 |
 |
|-
 |bgcolor="FFDF00" |
 |2
 |18
 |
 |
|-
 |bgcolor="FFA500" |
 |3
 |19
 |
 |
|-
 |bgcolor="FF5F5F" |
 |4
 |19
 |
 |
|-
 |bgcolor="3198FF" |
 |5
 |19
 |
 |
|-
 |bgcolor="0000FF" |
 |6
 |19
 |
 |
|-
 |bgcolor="643190" |
 |colspan=2|Film
 |colspan=2|
|-
|}

Episodes

Season 1 (2004)

Season 2 (2004–05)

Season 3 (2005–06)

Season 4 (2006–07)

Season 5 (2007–08)

Season 6 (2008–09)

See also
 Corner Gas: The Movie

References

External links

 Corner Gas Episode Guide
 

Lists of Canadian television series episodes
Lists of sitcom episodes
Lists of comedy television series episodes